"Sorrows of Werther" is a satirical poem by William Makepeace Thackeray written in response to the enormous success of Johann Wolfgang von Goethe's novel The Sorrows of Young Werther.

English poems
Works based on The Sorrows of Young Werther